Perulibatrachus is a genus of toadfishes known from the Indian and Atlantic Oceans.

Species
There are currently four recognized species in this genus:
 Perulibatrachus aquilonarius D. W. Greenfield, 2005
 Perulibatrachus elminensis (Bleeker, 1863) (Guinean toadfish)
 Perulibatrachus kilburni D. W. Greenfield, 1996
 Perulibatrachus rossignoli (C. Roux, 1957) (Rossignol's toadfish)

References

Batrachoididae